Luke Holland (born 1993) is an American drummer.

Luke Holland may also refer to:

Luke Holland (English filmmaker) (1948-2020), English filmmaker